J. B. Milleysack Cigar Factory is a historic cigar factory located at Lancaster, Lancaster County, Pennsylvania. It was built in 1898, and is a three-story, rectangular red brick building on a stone foundation.  It is three bays by four bays and has a shed-type roof. The building was damaged by fire in January 1990, and subsequently restored.  It housed a cigar factory and later a toy manufacturer.

It was listed on the National Register of Historic Places in 1990.

References

Industrial buildings and structures on the National Register of Historic Places in Pennsylvania
Industrial buildings completed in 1898
Buildings and structures in Lancaster, Pennsylvania
Tobacco buildings in the United States
Historic cigar factories
National Register of Historic Places in Lancaster, Pennsylvania